Coliseum College Prep Academy, commonly referred to as "CCPA", is a small public secondary school composed of a seven-year combination middle and high school (grades 6–12) located on the Havenscourt campus in East Oakland. It is part of the Oakland Unified School District, and gets its name from its close proximity to the Oakland Coliseum, and its colors from the Coliseum's baseball team, the Oakland A's.

Demographics
Coliseum College Prep Academy is small school serving 656 students in grades 6-12 during the 2021–22 school year. CCPA's ethnic demographics for the 2012–13 school year consisted of 0.7% Asian, 0.7% Native Hawaiian or Pacific Islander, 85.6% Hispanic or Latino, and 12.6% Black or African American. Of the students, 36.1% were designated as English Learners and 47.0% as Fluent-English-Proficient.

Campus
The Havenscourt campus hosts CCPA and a Health Center (La Clinica).

References

External links
CCPA's Home Page
Oakland Unified School District
CCPA's Facebook Page

Public middle schools in California
High schools in Oakland, California
Public high schools in California
2006 establishments in California
Oakland Unified School District